John Brace may refer to:

John Brace (MP) (1578–?), English politician
John Thurlow Brace (1685–?), British landowner and politician
John Brace (by 1519-59 or later), MP for Weymouth 1547 and Bletchingley 1559 
John Brace (MP for Worcestershire) (died c. 1431), MP for Worcestershire 1402,1415,1419,1421,1425
John Brace, see The Oaks

See also
Jonathan Brace (1754–1837), American lawyer, politician and judge